Frédérique Bernier is a Canadian writer and professor of literature at the Cégep de Saint-Laurent in Quebec. Her book Hantises won the Governor General's Award for French-language non-fiction at the 2020 Governor General's Awards.

References 

21st-century Canadian women writers
21st-century Canadian non-fiction writers
Canadian non-fiction writers in French
French Quebecers
Governor General's Award-winning non-fiction writers
Living people
Writers from Quebec
Year of birth missing (living people)